Thomas McGuigan (22 November 1922 – 14 December 1997) was a Scottish footballer who played for Ayr United, Hartlepool United and Spennymoor United.

Playing career
McGuigan began his playing career in 1922 with Ayr United. He played 74 times for Ayr, scoring 21 times.  

In 1950, McGuigan moved to English side Hartlepool United. McGuigan played 325 times for the club and was in the top 10 all time appearances list for Pools, until 2021 when he his tally was overtaken by Gary Liddle. He scored 79 times for Hartlepool including hat tricks against Halifax Town and Stockport County. As of 2022, McGuigan remains in the top 10 of the all time top goal scorers list for Hartlepool. His service to the club earned him a benefit game against Newcastle United in 1956 which Hartlepool won 6-3.

After leaving Hartlepool, McGuigan played for Spennymoor United.

As part of Hartlepool's centenary year in 2008, McGuigan was one of seven players to have a street named after them on a new housing development in the town.

In 2017, McGuigan was nominated as a part of a vote for Hartlepool United's greatest XI by The Northern Echo. The paper described him as a “hard-working forward” who was “full of honest endeavour and graft”.

Personal life
McGuigan died in Hartlepool on 14 December 1997, aged 75.  He is the grandfather of Premier League referee Tony Harrington.

References

1922 births
1997 deaths
People from Whitburn, West Lothian
Scottish footballers
Association football forwards
Ayr United F.C. players
Hartlepool United F.C. players
Spennymoor United F.C. players
Scottish Football League players
English Football League players